Tech Toyz is a weekly round-up of everything in the world of technology and information that airs on CNBC-TV18. It covers product launches and provides reviews and comparisons between products available in the market. The show is anchored by Megha Vishawnath.

Online 
Shows of the current season of Tech Toyz are available as complete episodes on the TV18 official website and on the popular video-sharing site YouTube.

Anchors 
Suresh Venkat is Executive Producer with CNBC TV18. Prior to this, he was Programming Head with Radio City in Bangalore and anchored a Saturday program Brunch with the Boss.

References

Indian television series